Shirley is a hamlet (and census-designated place) in Suffolk County, New York, United States. At the 2010 census, the population of Shirley was 27,854.  Shirley is the western terminus of Atlantic Crossing 1, a major submarine telecommunications cable linking the United States with the UK, Germany, and the Netherlands. Soon, the Emerald Express transatlantic communications cable will provide data connectivity between Europe and North America, landing in Shirley.

Shirley is a community in the Town of Brookhaven, on the South Shore of Long Island. It is named for developer Walter T. Shirley, who had the vision in the 1950s to turn the area on Mastic Bay into an affordable enclave. Shirley's company priced its 4,000 four-room homes starting at $4,700, and lots were priced at $295.

Shirley is served by the Mastic–Shirley Long Island Rail Road station. The station was a compromise when both Mastic and Shirley campaigned for it.  The Smith Point Bridge is the second of only two bridge crossings from Long Island to Fire Island, allowing beach goers easy access to the ocean without taking a ferry boat.

The 7th Precinct of the Suffolk County Police Department is located in Shirley. Most of Shirley, the southern part, is served by the William Floyd School District. The northern part is served by the Longwood Central School District.

Geography
Shirley is located at  (40.796914, -72.871020).

East Yaphank is another designation for the northern extent of Shirley. It is part of the USPS ZIP code 11967. The USPS accepts the name Shirley, Smith Point and East Yaphank for this neighborhood.

Demographics

Demographics for the CDP
As of the census of 2000, there were 26,395 people, 7,353 households, and 6,176 families residing in the Census-designated place (CDP). The population density was 2,282.5 per square mile (881.0/km2). There were 7,774 housing units at an average density of 698.7/sq mi (269.7/km2). The racial makeup of the CDP was 89.69% White, 3.33% African American, 0.32% Native American, 1.23% Asian, 0.03% Pacific Islander, 2.84% from other races, and 2.56% from two or more races. Hispanic or Latino of any race were 10.82% of the population.

There were 7,353 households, out of which 47.2% had children under the age of 18 living with them, 64.4% were married couples living together, 13.8% had a female householder with no husband present, and 16.0% were non-families. 11.6% of all households were made up of individuals, and 3.8% had someone living alone who was 65 years of age or older. The average household size was 3.43 and the average family size was 3.67.

In the CDP, the population was spread out, with 31.2% under the age of 18, 9.7% from 18 to 24, 31.9% from 25 to 44, 21.0% from 45 to 64, and 6.3% who were 65 years of age or older. The median age was 32 years. For every 100 females, there were 99.3 males. For every 100 females age 18 and over, there were 96.9 males.

Estimated median household income in 2011: $82,791 (it was $57,294 in 2000)

Media
W243BF is a radio station licensed to serve Shirley.

Notable people 
 Frank Coraci, film director
 Al Plastino, artist for DC Comics Superman and Batman
 Cletus Seldin (born 1986), boxer
 Lee Zeldin, United States congressman and candidate for Governor of New York
  Courtney Culkin, Playboy Playmate

References

External links

 Shirley History (Longwood Public Library)
 Tri Hamlet News | Online News for Mastics  • Shirley  • Moriches

Brookhaven, New York
Hamlets in New York (state)
Census-designated places in New York (state)
Census-designated places in Suffolk County, New York
Hamlets in Suffolk County, New York
Populated coastal places in New York (state)